The 2020 Davis Cup World Group II Play-offs were held on 6–7 March. The twelve winning teams from the play-offs qualified for the 2020 Davis Cup World Group II and the twelve losing teams would play at the Group III of the corresponding continental zone.

Teams
Twenty-four teams played for twelve spots in the World Group II, in series decided on a home and away basis.

These twenty-four teams are:
 12 losing teams from their Group II zone:
 12 teams from their Group III zone:
 4 from Europe
 3 from Asia/Oceania,
 3 from Americas, and
 2 from Africa.

The 12 winning teams from the play-offs would play at the World Group II and the 12 losing teams would play at the Group III of the corresponding continental zone.

Seeded teams
 
 
 
 
 
 
 
 
 
 
 
 

Unseeded teams

Results summary

World Group II Play-offs results

Latvia vs. Egypt

Paraguay vs. Sri Lanka

Morocco vs. Vietnam

Indonesia vs. Kenya

Guatemala vs. Tunisia

Costa Rica vs. Bulgaria

Poland vs. Hong Kong

Zimbabwe vs. Syria

Philippines vs. Greece

Denmark vs. Puerto Rico

El Salvador vs. Jamaica

Georgia vs. Estonia

References

External links

World Group